Wm. Stage, also known as William Stage (born June 30, 1951) is an American journalist, author, and photographer, with a focus on the area and history of the American Midwest and St. Louis, Missouri. From 1982 to 2004 he worked for the weekly newspaper The Riverfront Times, producing three columns, with the best known being Street Talk, where over the years he photographed and interviewed more than 8,500 random individuals about miscellaneous topics. He is also known for his documentary work on a special kind of historical outdoor advertising: vintage brick wall signs. As of 2016, he has authored 11 books, a combination of photography, non-fiction, and fiction, including Ghost Signs: Brick Wall Signs in America (1989), Mound City Chronicles (1991), and Litchfield: A Strange and Twisted Saga of Murder in the Midwest (1998). His photographs have appeared in multiple works, including the cover photograph on the Oxford University Press book, For the Common Good (2002). In 2001, Stage, who had been adopted as an infant, tracked down his biological family, a search which led to a Canadian television documentary and formed the basis for his 2009 memoir Fool for Life. In 2007, Stage was a guest commentator on the St. Louis NPR affiliate, KWMU-FM.

Early life

Wm. Stage was born in Kalamazoo, Michigan and immediately given up for adoption by his 19-year-old unwed mother. For three months he lived under the care of Catholic sisters in the St. Agnes Foundling Home, also in Kalamazoo, until he was adopted and taken to Grand Rapids, becoming the only child of Bill and Virginia Stage. As a boy, he took a keen interest in zoology and botany, roaming the woods and farmlands near his home. In 1969, he graduated from Catholic Central High School, and two weeks after his 18th birthday, he enlisted in the U.S. Army and was sent to Germany as a medic / ambulance driver. It was there he attended the University of Maryland Evening Division, studying English composition and German language. After the Army, he began natural history studies at Thomas Jefferson College, the now-defunct "hippie college," located on the campus of Grand Valley State University in Allendale, Michigan; he graduated four years later with a Bachelor of Philosophy degree [B Ph].

Epidemiologist
In 1978, at the age of 26, while working as an ambulance driver in Grand Rapids, he was recruited by Atlanta's Centers For Disease Control and assigned to the St. Louis City Health Department as a public health officer / STD epidemiologist. He was charged with interviewing those infected with STDs, primarily gonorrhea and syphilis, identifying others that they had been in contact with, and ensuring that all were properly treated. His work involved identifying which diseases were in the population, and when/if other new diseases were appearing. It was during this period, the early 1980s, when HIV/AIDS first appeared, so Stage and his colleagues saw from a clinical perspective the damage done by this disease. This exposure became the basis for his 2015 novel, Creatures on Display.

Writing and publishing
Stage began his journalist work in college, where as part of a work-study program, he wrote for the City of Grand Rapids Newsletter. After his move to St. Louis to work as a public health office, he began freelancing as a feature writer for local newspapers and magazines. In 1982, when his medical supervisors wanted to transfer Stage to work at a federal penitentiary, he left his position with the CDC to devote himself to journalism and photography.

by July 1982, Stage had been hired full-time with The Riverfront Times, a St. Louis-based alternative newsweekly which was founded by Ray Hartmann in 1977. He stayed with the paper until 2004, producing three different regular columns over a 22-year period, plus numerous magazine-style features. Have A Weird Day: Reflections and Ruminations on the St. Louis Experience, is a collection of expository writings that appeared in The Riverfront Times under a column titled "Mississippi Mud." From 2003 to 2013, he was a columnist with the St. Charles County [MO] Business Record. He has taught feature writing at the Defense Information School, Fort Benjamin Harrison, Indiana; and photojournalism at Saint Louis University School for Professional Studies. He is a 1995 alumnus of the week-long Missouri Photo Workshop, offered since 1949 by the University of Missouri-Columbia School of Journalism and held in a different Missouri town each year.

For three years [2005–2008] Stage and his pre-teen daughter Margaret E. Stage produced a monthly for-profit newspaper, Black White & Read All Over, which they distributed in the Lafayette Square neighborhood of St. Louis. In 2010, father and daughter collaborated again with the publication of The Painted Ad: A Postcard Book of Vintage Brick Wall Signs. This work followed the lead of his first book, Ghost Signs: Brick Wall Signs in America, which was the first commercially produced and distributed book on the subject. The authorship of Ghost Signs earned Stage a seat on the board of The Society For Commercial Archeology, at the time based in the Smithsonian Institution and later based in Madison, Wisconsin.

Stage founded two publishing companies. Cumquat Publishing Company, which wholesales art and novelty postcards to bookstores and museum gift shops, while Floppinfish Publishing Company Ltd. is a small-scale book publisher.

In 2001, at the age of 50, Stage found his natural family, first making contact with his biological mother and her children, and later making contact with the children of his late biological father. His lifelong identity as an only child was suddenly altered; he now had a "new family," a second set of relatives including a mother, seven half-brothers and sisters as well as numerous aunts and cousins scattered throughout the eastern United States and Nova Scotia. In 2004, Stage was the subject of an episode of  "Past Lives,"
 a documentary-style show on Canadian TV that focuses on people in search of their roots. The half-hour program, filmed on Cape Breton Island, ran Canada-wide and was seen in re-runs for four years. These events were humorously chronicled in a December 2003 cover story in The Riverfront Times and formed the core of Stage's comic memoir Fool For Life. Five years in the writing, Fool was well received by both the reading public and critics alike and bolstered Stage's reputation as a prose humorist.

In 2007, Stage began voicing guest commentaries on KWMU-FM, the NPR affiliate in St. Louis. Topics ranged from the folly of Daylight Saving Time to the joys of ice skating.

In 2010, Stage's prose turned from creating nonfiction to fiction. He published a collection of short stories, Not Waving Drowning (2011), and then Creatures on Display (2015), his first full-length novel, based on his experience as an STD epidemiologist during his years of working for the CDC.

Photography
As of 2016, Stage has authored four books on photography, largely falling into the genre of street photography. While doing a popular column for The Riverfront Times, "Street Talk," Stage posed quirky or philosophical man-on-the-street questions to unwitting subjects, of whom he also obtained a photo. Overall, he captured more than 8,500 faces on film, featuring people from every walk of life, including celebrities and notables such as Robert Mapplethorpe, Dick Gregory, Jimmy Carter, Kurt Vonnegut, Ken Kesey, Queen Ida, Sir Edmund Hillary, and Jerry Seinfeld. A select collection of those portraits became a book, Pictures of People. Some of his photos have been widely exhibited and purchased for inclusion in various private collections.

Starting in the mid-1970s, Stage began documenting a bygone form of advertising where signs were painted on walls of brick buildings, and then faded over the years. Some of these wall signs, dating back to the 1800s, have become known as ghost signs. In 1989, he published a book of his photographs, Ghost Signs: Brick Wall Signs in America, then in 2011 The Painted Ad: A Postcard Book of Vintage Brick Wall Signs, and in 2013 under The History Press, Fading Ads of St. Louis, a collection of vintage advertisements found on brick buildings around St. Louis.

In 2014, a major exposition of his 36 years of work in photography, Pictures of People, was presented at the Sheldon Concert Hall & Art Galleries in St. Louis.

Personal
Wm. Stage lives in St. Louis with his wife, Mary, and their six daughters.

Works

Photographic

Ghost Signs: Brick Wall Signs in America [1989]
Pictures Of People [2006]
The Painted Ad: A Postcard Book of Vintage Brick Wall Signs [2011] with Margaret Stage
 Fading Ads of St. Louis [2013]

Nonfiction

Fiction / memoir

Fool For Life [2009]
Not Waving, Drowning [2012]
Creatures On Display – A Novel [2015]

As contributor

Photographs appear in St. Louis: Home On The River – Urban Tapestry Series – Towery Publishing Inc., 1995
Photographs appear in St. Louis: For The Record – Urban Tapestry Series – Towery Publishing Inc., 1999
Cover photograph "Three Of A Kind" appears on For the Common Good? American Civic Life and the Golden Age of Fraternity – Jason Kaufman, author – Oxford University Press Inc. 2002
Photographs appear in Outhouses – Holly L. Bollinger, author – MBI Publishing Company, 2005
Photographs appear in St. Louis Seen & Unseen – Michael Kilfoy, author – Virginia Publishing, 2006
 Introduction to Fading Ads of New York City – Frank Jump, author – The History Press, 2011

References

Living people
1951 births
American male journalists
Writers from Grand Rapids, Michigan
Writers from Kalamazoo, Michigan
Writers from St. Louis
American photographers
Grand Valley State University alumni